José Pereira (born 26 January 1991), also known as Zé Pereira, is a Brazilian professional tennis player.

Biography

Early life
Born in Santana do Ipanema, Pereira moved to Curitiba as a young child. His father, José Sr, was originally a sugarcane cutter but got work in Curitiba at a tennis academy and eventually the entire family got involved in tennis. Teliana Pereira, José's elder sister, competed on the WTA Tour and is the most successful of his tennis playing siblings,.

Tennis career
Pereira had a world ranking as high as four on the ITF Junior Circuit and was a two-time winner of the Copa Gerdau. In 2010 he won his first ITF Futures title. He attained his career high ranking of 232 in the world in 2015 and featured in the qualifying draw for the 2016 Australian Open. Injuries have hampered his progress in recent seasons and his ranking fell significantly, but in 2022 he secured his first singles title for five years and has re-entered the world's top 400.

ATP Challenger/ITF Tour finals

Singles: 31 (12–19)

Doubles: 33 (19–14)

References

External links
 
 

1991 births
Living people
Brazilian male tennis players
Sportspeople from Alagoas
Sportspeople from Curitiba